Mintraching is a municipality in the district of Regensburg in Bavaria in Germany.

Notable people 
 Annette Erös
 Reinhard Erös

References

Regensburg (district)